Clerence Chyntia Audry (18 June 1994 – 18 October 2022) was an Indonesian television actress.

Early life 
Clerence Chyntia Audry was born on 18 June 1994 in Bekasi, West Java, to Edy Soeripto and Wenny binti Sarni (1956–2020). She had one sister named Windy Vanholme.

Personal life 
Clerence married Noah additional member Rio Alief at Pancar Mountain area in Bogor, West Java, on 6 November 2020.

Illness and death 
Clerence was diagnosed with cancer in February 2022. Within two months, the cancer reached stage four.

In May 2022, Clerence announced on her Instagram account that she was undergoing medical treatment.

Clerence died at Dr. Cipto Mangunkusumo Hospital in Senen, Central Jakarta, on 18 October 2022 due to cancer which was later discovered as a angiosarcoma cancer at the age of 28.

Her funeral was held at TPU Jombang, South Tangerang, on the same day.

Career 
Clerence started her career by partaking a role on the Indonesian soap opera Anak Jalanan.

She then actively starred in television movies.

Television

References

External links 
 

1994 births
2022 deaths
Indonesian television actresses
21st-century Indonesian actresses
People from Bekasi
Deaths from cancer in Indonesia
Deaths from angiosarcoma